Mystery Diagnosis is a television docudrama series that aired on OWN: Oprah Winfrey Network. Each episode focuses on two or more individuals who have struggled with obscure medical ailments, and their quest for a diagnosis. The program details the patients' and doctors' difficulty in pinpointing a diagnosis; often due to nonspecific symptoms, masquerading syndromes, the rarity of the condition or disease, or the patient's case being an unusual manifestation of said condition or disease.

The series debuted on Discovery Health Channel in 2005, and was continued when the Oprah Winfrey Network replaced Discovery Health on January 1, 2011. The last season premiered January 5, 2011.

Description
Each episode tells the stories of two patients who experienced difficult to diagnose medical conditions. Each segment generally begins with a short description of the patient's life before they fell ill (or in the case of a young child, the parents' life before the child was born). The symptoms that the person experienced are described from their onset, usually becoming progressively worse; the progression is often re-enacted by actors while the original patient narrates. The show chronicles the patient's visits from doctor to doctor, where they may receive misdiagnoses or be told that the doctors have found nothing wrong. After continuing to experience symptoms for an extended period of time, the person discovers a doctor who is able to solve their case. The doctor reviews the patient's medical records, notices a symptom that his or her colleagues overlooked, performing tests, and finally reaching the correct diagnosis and giving the proper treatment. This is followed by a brief explanation of why the disorder was so difficult to diagnose, and a description of what the person's life is like today. Usually, the patient is still alive. Some have died after the episode was taped or aired, and only one has died before the diagnosis (though his afflicted brother survived).

The series has no regular cast except for its narrator, David Guion (2005–2009) and David Scott (2009–2011), who describes the patients' lives and the destruction their illnesses bring. The patients along with their friends and family help to narrate their stories.

While the majority of the conditions examined in the series are unusual or rare conditions (such as cryoglobulinemia) or genetic disorders, well-known conditions such as epilepsy, Myasthenia gravis, Alpha 1-antitrypsin deficiency, heart disease, Crohn's disease, pulmonary hypertension, Lyme disease, endocarditis and cancer have featured on the show. A significant number of episodes revolve around autoimmune disorders, ranging from Pyoderma gangrenosum to Paraneoplastic cerebellar degeneration.

Episodes

Other activities
In 2009, Mystery Diagnosis was named the program partner in organizing Rare Disease Day, an observance intended to raise awareness of rare diseases among the general public and policy-makers. Mystery Diagnosis worked with the United States coordinator, National Organization for Rare Disorders, to organize events across the country for observing Rare Disease Day at the end of February.

All episodes formerly premiered on Discovery Health channel, The Learning Channel (TLC), and sometimes on the Discovery Channel. As of January 2011, new episodes were aired on OWN. The show later re-aired on Discovery Life.

The show is not currently on Discovery+, the streaming service offered by Discovery.

References

External links
 

2005 American television series debuts
2011 American television series endings
Oprah Winfrey Network original programming
2000s American medical television series
2010s American medical television series
English-language television shows
Discovery Health Channel original programming